Belinda Tanoto is on the board member of trustees at Tanoto Foundation, a philanthropic organization for poverty alleviation. She is the youngest daughter of Sukanto Tanoto.

Education 
Tanoto graduated from the University of Pennsylvania, Wharton School magna cum laude, receiving a bachelor's degree in finance and political science, and attained her MBA from Harvard Business School. In October 2017, she was named to The Wharton School's "40 Under 40" list, which seeks to recognize impressive young Wharton alumni.

Career 
After graduation, Tanoto spent a year as an analyst at Morgan Stanley. Tanoto works in Royal Golden Eagle (RGE)’s palm oil business, serving as a member of the Management Committee of RGE-managed Apical Group, responsible for the strategic management of the palm oil group. As senior commercial manager, she also drives trading and business development activities for RGE's downstream palm oil business.

Philanthropy 

At the Tanoto Foundation, she works to improve access to quality education and empowerment opportunities, contributing to poverty reduction. Tanoto also coordinates and creates key philanthropic strategies at the Foundation. She also spends time with stakeholders to better understand their issues and the root causes of poverty in Indonesia.

Tanoto has also participated in public forums and fund raisers to advocate the Foundation's mission and programs, sharing her perspectives on philanthropy, the value of education, and the importance of public-private collaboration in achieving true social change. She was a speaker at the 2016 UBS Philanthropy Forum Asia where she shared insights into how the Foundation tackles complex and challenging issues in Indonesia's education system.  She also participated in the Channel NewsAsia Perspectives Programme twice as a panelist, speaking on inequality in Asia in 2015 and on social inclusion in 2017. Additionally, she was a speaker at the Milken Institute Global Conference 2017, where innovative approaches to philanthropy were discussed.

Given the Foundation's emphasis on education as a key pillar for poverty alleviation, Tanoto has spearheaded the Foundation's investments in rural schools in Indonesia since 2009, specifically in school leadership, teacher training, and literacy. She has stated that the greatest innovations in education over the next decade will come from classroom teachers and educators on the ground.

Tanoto works with various stakeholders to improve the quality of education, increase the competency of teachers, and provide adequate facilities and infrastructure for schools. She engages teachers on topics including effective pedagogical techniques, and creative teaching methodology and leadership. She also interacts with students and parents, seeking feedback on how the foundation can improve its programs.

She recently collaborated with major philanthropists and various aid agencies, including the United Nations Development Programme, on the issue of rural poverty with a landscape mapping of regional efforts. Her goal is to form strategic partnerships to bring about substantial change.

Tanoto's activism work also includes promoting social entrepreneurship, supporting women's empowerment, and identifying donations to medical research bodies. She served as a judge for the inaugural Crossing the Chasm Challenge in Singapore in 2016, organized by the Asia Centre for Social Enterprises and Philanthropy (ACSEP) at the National University of Singapore. Students from the University worked with industry mentors to help top ASEAN social enterprises devise marketing plans and pitches for ways to end poverty.

References 

Living people
University of Pennsylvania alumni
Indonesian people of Chinese descent
Harvard Business School alumni
Year of birth missing (living people)